Haslett is a surname. Notable people with the surname include:

 Adam Haslett (born 1970), American fiction writer
 Alexander Haslett (1883–1951), Irish independent politician
 Caroline Haslett (1895–1957), British electrical engineer and electricity industry administrator
 Jim Haslett (born 1955), defensive coordinator of the Washington Redskins
 John F. Haslett (21st century), American writer